RoadRUNNER is a bimonthly publication covering motorcycle touring. It is based out of Winston-Salem, NC, and first appeared in the bookstores in 2001. It is also available via subscription in the U.S. and Canada. Contents include coverage of tours, product reviews, and maps for the featured tour.  In addition to sports, touring, cruising and dual-sport bikes, the magazine also covers vintage bikes and motor scooters.  RoadRUNNER was started by Christian and Christa Neuhauser in 2001.

References

https://www.revzilla.com/common-tread/how-roadrunner-magazine-has-survived-as-other-print-motorcycle-magazines-died

External links
 Official site

Bimonthly magazines published in the United States
Motorcycle magazines published in the United States
Magazines established in 2001
Motorcycle touring
Tourism magazines
Magazines published in North Carolina
Mass media in Winston-Salem, North Carolina